Saint-Pierre-en-Auge (literally Saint-Pierre in Auge) is a commune in the department of Calvados, northwestern France. The municipality was established on 1 January 2017 by merger of the former communes of Saint-Pierre-sur-Dives (the seat), Boissey, Bretteville-sur-Dives, Hiéville, Mittois, Montviette, L'Oudon, Ouville-la-Bien-Tournée, Sainte-Marguerite-de-Viette, Saint-Georges-en-Auge, Thiéville, Vaudeloges and Vieux-Pont-en-Auge.

Population

See also 
Communes of the Calvados department

References 

Saintpierreenauge
Populated places established in 2017
2017 establishments in France